Living with Fran is an American television sitcom that aired on The WB. It starred Fran Drescher and Ryan McPartlin, and was co-created by Jamie Kennedy. The series debuted on April 8, 2005, and ran two seasons before ending on March 24, 2006.

Premise
Fran Reeves is an interior designer and divorced mother of two. Her son, Josh, recently dropped out of medical school and now lives at home with his younger sister, Allison, his mother and her young boyfriend, Riley Martin. Fran deals with the visits of her sleazy ex-husband, Ted, and her divorced cousin, Merrill. Fran also must deal with the fact that others, including her son, disapprove of the relationship she has with her much younger boyfriend. In the episode "Dreaming with Fran", Fran breaks up with Riley because of the age difference but in the next episode, Riley proposes to Fran.

Cast

Main
 Fran Drescher as Fran Reeves – Fran plays an interior designer who is the mother of two. She had her first kid, Josh Reeves, at seventeen.
 Ryan McPartlin as Riley Douglas Martin – Riley is Fran's younger boyfriend who is twenty-six years old.
 Misti Traya as Allison Reeves – Allison is Fran's fifteen-year-old daughter. She and her brother Josh do not get along all the time. Unlike Josh, she does not seem to mind her mother dating a younger man.
 Ben Feldman as Josh Reeves – Josh is Fran's twenty-one-year-old son who dropped out of medical school. It is revealed that he was forced to go in the first place because of his father, but could not handle the sight of blood. He starts working at a video store. Unlike Allison, he is opposed to his mother dating a younger guy, and often makes fun of the two by comparing their ages. Despite this, he gets along quite well with Riley's father upon his appearance. He has nothing but contempt for his father and the two make barbs against each other every time they see each other.

Recurring
 Charles Shaughnessy as Ted Reeves – Ted Reeves is Fran's ex-husband. He is a doctor, and the man who forced Josh into medical school. He is something of a confidence trickster. He is described in one episode as being unsupportive of Josh's dreams. He later makes an appearance in person, and seems to have a poor relationship with his kids, mainly Josh. He enjoys making fun of his son, Riley, and Fran during his appearances, but takes more "kindly" to his daughter, Allison. He also flirts a lot with younger women.
 Debi Mazar as Merrill – Merill is Fran's unmarried cousin who appears in several episodes. She later gets hooked up with one of Riley's friends, and in season two, she is engaged. During her engagement party in the last episode, Riley and Fran are broken up. 
Caitlin Crosby as Becca – Allison's best friend who at one point had a crush on Josh, which temporarily ruined her friendship with Allison until Josh told her he was not interested. She appears in several episodes in both season one and two, spending time with Allison. She plays the guitar and sings, later revealed in season two when she sings at Merill's engagement party in the episode "Reuniting with Fran".

Guest
 Marilu Henner as Donna Martin – Donna is Riley's mother who always makes rude comments about Fran's age, even comparing her to an antique. This amuses Fran's son, Josh. By the end of the episode, however, she and Fran start to get along better after he ends up in the hospital for a cut. After her first appearance, Donna makes no more appearances in person, but does call during the arrival of her daughter, Jenny, making sure she is okay.
 John Schneider as Tom Martin – Tom is Riley's father. Unlike his wife, he is not as rude, and supports his son in everything he does. He and Josh get along very well in the series, forming a father-and-son-like relationship.
 Lauren Woodland as Jenny Martin – Jenny is Riley's younger sister around Josh's age. She innocent and sweet, and Donna appears to be quite protective of her, calling Fran repeatedly before her arrival. She and Josh accidentally get married after they get drunk, but their marriage is terminated later based on the circumstances. She is engaged to be married.
 Hal Linden as Grandpa Hal – Hal is Cookie's husband and Fran's father. According to the family members, he "hates" Riley and believes Fran is taking care of him. He loses all his money to Riley in a bet, but Riley uses the money to send him and his wife on a vacation, possibly resolving their differences.
 Ryan Devlin as Todd – Todd is Allison's older boyfriend who is disliked by Fran and Riley. In season 2 he is dumped by Allison after lying to her.
 Lainie Kazan as "Nana" Cookie – Cookie is Fran's mother. She likes Riley, but her relationship with her daughter is another story. Whenever Fran tries to make a decision, she claims she is not going to say anything, but ends up disagreeing with her decision anyhow and then pointing out her mistakes. She also blames Fran for her missing a concert because she got into an accident on the exact day that Cookie was going to go see it.

Production
The series was originally titled Shacking Up, and was ordered to series by The WB for the 2004–05 television season, though it ultimately did not premiere in fall 2004 and was held for midseason. The early tapings of the show frustrated star Fran Drescher, and the series' original showrunners were replaced before the show ever aired. It was not renamed until very close to its premiere; episodes of television entertainment shows like Extra can be found on the internet discussing the show with the cast and previewing clips while still calling it Shacking Up.

The series was executive produced by actor and comedian Jamie Kennedy, known for his roles in the Scream film series. He also appeared on an episode of the first season as a flamboyant, stripper-coach Fran hires to surprise Riley for their anniversary.

On October 18, 2005, The WB removed Living with Fran from its Friday night schedule, replacing with the new series Twins, indicating that the series was just being put on hiatus and that the remaining nine episodes of the second season would air at a later date. The show returned Friday, January 13, 2006, at 8:30p.m. The second-season finale aired on Friday, March 24, 2006. In the episode, Riley proposed to Fran; the episode was a cliffhanger, and Fran's answer was not revealed. On May 17, 2006, one day before the upfronts, it was announced that Living with Fran would not be returning for a third season in fall 2006 on the new CW network, which was the result of the merger of the former WB and UPN networks.

Episodes

Season 1 (2005)

Season 2 (2005–06)

Ratings
The premiere episode of Living with Fran airing at 8:30p.m. on April 8, 2005, drew 3.1 million viewers and a 1.3 rating/5 share in adults 18–49 in preliminary ratings, improving on the ratings of its lead-in What I Like About You, while the followup episode of the show that the same evening at 9:30p.m. retained approximately 90% of the audience from its lead-in Reba. The series was considered a "solid" performer in its first season according to Varietys Rick Kissell.

References

External links
  
 

2005 American television series debuts
2006 American television series endings
2000s American sitcoms
English-language television shows
Television series by 20th Century Fox Television
The WB original programming